Impact Motorsports is a former NASCAR Craftsman Truck Series team. It was owned by David Hodson and Russell Kersh from 1997 until 2001, when it was sold to Phil Bonifield.

Impact debuted in 1997 at the Chevy Trucks Challenge at Walt Disney World Speedway. Stacy Compton drove the No. 86 Valvoline Ford F-150 to a tenth-place finish. Compton and Impact ran the entire season, and finished third behind Kenny Irwin Jr. and Rick Crawford for Rookie of the Year. The next season, R.C. Cola jumped on board to sponsor, and Compton won twice that season, at Portland and Kansas. He also was named Most Popular Driver as the team finished seventh in points. At that time, rumors began spreading that the team might run a Winston Cup race at Martinsville Speedway that year with Compton driving, but those plans never materialized. In 1999, Impact switched to Dodge and started a new team, the No. 25 Superguard truck driven by Randy Tolsma. Compton did not win, but collected six poles and finished fourth in points, while Tolsma had ten top-tens and finished 11th in points.

In 2000, Compton left for Melling Racing, and he was replaced by Mike Cope. Despite Cope putting together three top-twenty finishes, he was released from his ride. He was originally replaced by Doug George, then by rookie Scott Riggs. Riggs immediately clicked with the team, posting eight top-ten finishes during his tenure with the team, who finished 15th in owner's points that season. Tolsma, meanwhile, picked up a win at Nashville Speedway USA and finished eighth in points. The team added a third truck to its stable, the No. 12 Dodge driven by Carlos Contreras and sponsored by Hot Wheels. In his rookie season, Contreras had a pair of top-tens and finished 17th in points.

After the season, RC Cola, Supergard, Tolsma, Contreras, and Riggs all left the team. Miccosukee Gambling Group and the National Wild Turkey Federation originally signed to sponsor the 25 and 86 respectively trucks at the beginning of the season, as well as the team switching back to Ford, with Barry Bodine and Derrike Cope driving the two trucks. Bodine had two starts, the best of which being a 12th at Homestead, and Cope finishing 16th at Daytona. After Homestead however, the 25 shut down, and Cope left the 86. Jason White took over the 86, and had a best finish of 13th, but the team was starting to suffer big financial problems, and had to switch to a part-time schedule. Randy Briggs, Dana White, Jason Thom, and Rich Woodland, Jr. all ran for the team, before Phil Bonifield finished out the year. At the end of the season, the team's mounting financial difficulties forced the team to close its doors. The equipment and owner's points were purchased by Bonifield.

Sources 
David Hodson - NASCAR Owner
Racing Reference

Auto racing teams established in 1997
Auto racing teams disestablished in 2001
American auto racing teams
Companies based in North Carolina
Defunct NASCAR teams
Defunct companies based in North Carolina
1997 establishments in North Carolina
2001 disestablishments in North Carolina